
Gmina Kleszczów is a rural gmina (administrative district) in Bełchatów County, Łódź Voivodeship, in central Poland.

Kleszczów is probably the wealthiest gmina in Poland (by income from tax). In relation to the poorest it has about 100 times more income. The reason is the presence of the "Bełchatów" coal mine (coal is called "black gold" in Poland, being one of the biggest resources) and Bełchatów Power Station. Because of it, where income from the mine and powerhouse gives 160 mln PLN from taxes, Kleszczów has higher (over a dozen times) tax income per capita than in the state city of Poland - Warsaw about 33560,89 zł per capita (also because of low population). Because of it, in this gmina there are services free for inhabitants: swimming pool, meals and holidays for minors, better roads and free separate private medical service access, which is unusual in Poland.

Villages
Gmina Kleszczów contains the villages and settlements of Adamów, Antoniówka, Biłgoraj, Bogumiłów, Czyżów, Dąbrowa, Dębina, Faustynów, Kamień, Karolów, Kleszczów, Kocielizna, Kolonia Łuszczanowice, Łękińsko, Łuszczanowice, Piaski, Rogowiec, Słok-Młyn, Stefanowizna, Wola Grzymalina, Wolica and Żłobnica.

Neighbouring gminas
Gmina Kleszczów is bordered by the gminas of Bełchatów, Dobryszyce, Kamieńsk, Kluki, Lgota Wielka, Sulmierzyce and Szczerców.

References
 Polish official population figures 2006

Kleszczow
Bełchatów County